Zellerndorf is a town in the district of Hollabrunn in Lower Austria, Austria.

Geography
Zellerndorf lies in the Weinviertel in Lower Austria near Retz and Pulkau. Only about 1.47 percent of the municipality is forested.

References

Cities and towns in Hollabrunn District